"Valleri" is a song written by Tommy Boyce and Bobby Hart for the Monkees. The single reached #3 on the Billboard Hot 100 and spent two weeks at #1 on the Cash Box chart in early 1968. The song also rose to #1 in Canada and #12 in the UK.

Background
Screen Gems president and music supervisor Don Kirshner asked Tommy Boyce and Bobby Hart if they had any "girl's-name" songs to be used in the Monkees television series. After claiming that they had a finished song, Boyce and Hart improvised "Valleri" on their way to Kirshner's office. Kirshner was pleased with their work, and "Valleri" was recorded with Boyce and Hart producing the original sessions in August 1966.

The original recording included instrumental backing by the Candy Store Prophets. Wrecking Crew session musician Louie Shelton contributed a flamenco-style guitar solo consisting of hammer-ons and pull-offs. The song was featured in the television show's first season in 1967; a staged performance showed Michael Nesmith apparently picking Shelton's guitar solo via cuts between Nesmith with his hands obscured and close-ups of hands playing the solo. While the first version of "Valleri" went unreleased, a few off-air recordings received radio airplay when some DJs recorded the song from the television and later surfaced on bootleg recordings.

According to Hart, the original 1966 track could not be used because union contracts had already been filed with Boyce and Hart listed as producers, and the Monkees' contracts stipulated that all future recordings would show "Produced by the Monkees" on the label. Boyce and Hart were approached about coming back to produce a new version of the track. Hart said: "[Colgems president] Lester Sill came back to us and said, 'They want you to recut Valleri. You can't have producers credit, but we want you to go back in and do it again, making it sound as close to the original as possible.'" The new recording was produced by Boyce and Hart on December 26, 1967.

When Sill heard the track, he felt it that needed something more, and had a brass section overdubbed on December 28. The remade "Valleri" was released on February 17, 1968. In the United States, the song reached #3 on the Billboard Hot 100 and #1 on the Cash Box singles chart. The single would be the band's last American top-10 hit, their last to receive a push from their television series and their last to be certified gold. The follow-up single, "D. W. Washburn," was not featured on the show, and only reached #19 on the pop charts.

The song consists mainly of four chords (F major, E major, A major and C major), and the bridge introduces some harmonic variety (from F major to D minor, twice).

Other appearances

The original recording of "Valleri" was finally released in January 1990 as part of the Rhino Records collection Missing Links, Volume II, along with several other versions of songs used in the TV series.

Single and LP releases of the second version, as well versions appearing on subsequent packages, feature a fadeout ending. The cold-ending version (heard in one episode of the television series and credited as "Valerie") was first released on Arista's Then & Now... The Best of the Monkees compilation in 1986. Subsequent hits packages and reissues of the single on the Flashback label also feature the longer version. Early examples of the Flashback single release have the fadeout ending.

The song "Barmy" by the Fall from the 1985 album This Nation's Saving Grace includes a riff based on "Valleri."

Live history
When Davy Jones, Micky Dolenz and Peter Tork reunited in 1986 to tour as the Monkees, they frequently featured "Valleri" in their set lists.

Chart performance

Weekly charts

Year-end charts

See also
List of Cash Box Top 100 number-one singles of 1968

References

Bibliography
 The Monkees Tale, Eric Lefcowitz (Last Gasp Press)
 Monkeemania! The True Story of the Monkees, Glenn A. Baker, Tom Czarnota & Peter Hogan (St. Martin's Press)

External links
1968 singles charts @ Musicseek.info
 

1968 singles
1968 songs
The Monkees songs
Songs written by Bobby Hart
Songs written by Tommy Boyce
American psychedelic rock songs
Cashbox number-one singles
RPM Top Singles number-one singles